The Alex Cole Cabin is a historic house in Sevier County, Tennessee, United States, along Roaring Fork within the Great Smoky Mountains National Park. The last remaining building of the community of Sugarlands community proper, it was built by Albert Alexander "Alex" Cole (1870–1958). After being placed on the National Register of Historic Places in the 1970s, the cabin was moved to the Jim Bales Place along the Roaring Fork Motor Nature Trail (the last owners of the Jim Bales Place lived in a relatively modern frame house).

Alex Cole was one of the most industrious residents of the Sugarlands.  In the early 1900s, Cole and his sons made a weekly trek across Sugarland Mountain via what is now the Huskey Gap Trail to Elkmont, where they worked for the Little River Lumber Company.  As tourism increased in the mountains in the 1920s, Cole began offering his services as a mountain guide, especially for tourists wanting to hike to the summit of Mount Le Conte.  Historian Vic Weals wrote that Cole's "considerable knowledge of his wilderness" made him "one of the more sought-after native guides."

The walls are built of hewn logs with dovetail notching. Fieldstone and loose rock comprise the cabin's foundation, and the cabin's gabled roof is covered with hand-split shingles. The interior contains a sawn board floor and a loft, and is accessed by a sawn board door. The chimney is built of masonry rubble.

References

Gatlinburg, Tennessee
Houses in Sevier County, Tennessee
Houses on the National Register of Historic Places in Tennessee
Log cabins in the United States
National Register of Historic Places in Sevier County, Tennessee
National Register of Historic Places in Great Smoky Mountains National Park
Log buildings and structures on the National Register of Historic Places in Tennessee